Grace Cathedral may refer to:

Grace Cathedral, congregation of televangelist Ernest Angley in Cuyahoga Falls, Ohio
Grace Cathedral, San Francisco
Grace Church Cathedral, Charleston, South Carolina 
Grace Episcopal Cathedral (Topeka, Kansas)

de:Grace Cathedral